Ian Powell Bancroft, Baron Bancroft  (23 December 1922 – 19 November 1996) was a British senior civil servant.

Life
He was born at Barrow-in-Furness, the son of a teacher. He was educated at Sir William Turner's Grammar School, Coatham and Balliol College, Oxford, where he read English. He served with the Rifle Brigade in France from 1942–43, reaching the rank of Captain.

After leaving the Army he joined the Civil Service, serving as Private Secretary to the Second Secretary to the Treasury Sir Henry Wilson Smith from 1948–50, to the Chancellor of the Exchequer Rab Butler from 1953–55, and also to Butler as Lord Privy Seal from 1955–57. He was Principal Private Secretary to the Chancellor of the Exchequer Reginald Maudling in 1964, continuing under James Callaghan until 1966, when he became an Under-Secretary to the Treasury.

In 1968 he moved to the same position in the new Civil Service Department, then to the Department of the Environment as Deputy Secretary and Director General of Organisation and Establishments from 1970–72. From 1972–73 he was a Commissioner of HM Customs and Excise, then Second Permanent Secretary at the Civil Service Department until 1975.

He returned to the Department of the Environment as Permanent Secretary from 1975–77 before becoming Permanent Secretary to the Civil Service Department and Head of the Home Civil Service in 1978. In 1981 Margaret Thatcher abolished the Civil Service Department, effectively ending his career.

Honours
He was appointed a Companion of the Order of the Bath in the 1971 Birthday Honours, a Knight Commander in the 1975 New Year Honours, and a Knight Grand Cross in 1979 New Year Honours.

On 15 February 1982 he was created a life peer as Baron Bancroft, of Coatham in the County of Cleveland, and took his seat in the House of Lords.

Personal life
He was married in 1950 to Jean Swaine, by whom he had two sons and a daughter. Lord Bancroft died in London in 1996.

References

1922 births
Alumni of Balliol College, Oxford
Rifle Brigade officers
British Army personnel of World War II
Permanent Secretaries of the Civil Service Department
Permanent Under-Secretaries of State for the Environment
Knights Grand Cross of the Order of the Bath
1996 deaths
People educated at Sir William Turner's Grammar School, Redcar
Life peers created by Elizabeth II